Nicorette (also known as Charles Jourdan, Royal Blue) is a maxi yacht designed by Guy Ribadeau-Dumas and built by MAG-Nordhal Mabire.

Career
Charles Jourdan participated in the 1989–90 Whitbread Round the World Race. She was heavily modified by Jussi Mannerberg design team in 1994, and as Nicorette won the 1995 Fastnet Race helmed by Ludde Ingvall. Royal Blue won the 1997 Fastnet Race, helmed by Gunnar Ekdahl.

See also
Nicorette (1996 yacht)

References

1980s sailing yachts
Sailing yachts built in France
Sailing yachts of France
Sailing yachts of Sweden
Fastnet Race yachts